José Luis Espinosa (born 19 January 1941) is a Mexican boxer. He competed in the men's middleweight event at the 1972 Summer Olympics.

References

1941 births
Living people
Mexican male boxers
Olympic boxers of Mexico
Boxers at the 1972 Summer Olympics
Place of birth missing (living people)
Middleweight boxers